West Belmar is an unincorporated community and census-designated place (CDP) within Wall Township, in Monmouth County, New Jersey, United States. At the 2010 census, the CDP's population was 2,493.

Geography
According to the United States Census Bureau, the CDP had a total area of 0.470 square miles (1.216 km2), all of which was land.

Demographics

Census 2010

Census 2000
At the 2000 census there were 2,606 people, 1,000 households, and 673 families living in the CDP. The population density was 2,096.2/km2 (5,450.2/mi2). There were 1,096 housing units at an average density of 881.6/km2 (2,292.2/mi2). The racial makeup of the CDP was 95.47% White, 0.92% African American, 0.19% Native American, 1.27% Asian, 0.27% Pacific Islander, 0.84% from other races, and 1.04% from two or more races. Hispanic or Latino of any race were 2.57% of the population.

Of the 1,000 households 34.1% had children under the age of 18 living with them, 50.5% were married couples living together, 12.2% had a female householder with no husband present, and 32.7% were non-families. 27.7% of households were one person and 9.7% were one person aged 65 or older. The average household size was 2.61 and the average family size was 3.21.

The age distribution was 26.2% under the age of 18, 7.0% from 18 to 24, 34.3% from 25 to 44, 22.1% from 45 to 64, and 10.3% 65 or older. The median age was 36 years. For every 100 females, there were 94.9 males. For every 100 females age 18 and over, there were 91.1 males.

The median household income was $56,367 and the median family income  was $60,144. Males had a median income of $46,458 versus $32,500 for females. The per capita income for the CDP was $22,276. About 4.5% of families and 3.1% of the population were below the poverty line, including 3.4% of those under age 18 and 6.5% of those age 65 or over.

References

Census-designated places in Monmouth County, New Jersey
Wall Township, New Jersey